R570 road may refer to:
 R570 road (Ireland)
 R570 (South Africa)